1634: The Galileo Affair is the fourth book and third novel published in the 1632 series. It is co-written by American authors Eric Flint and Andrew Dennis and was published in 2004. It follows the activities of an embassy party sent from the United States of Europe (Grantville) to Venice, Italy, where the three young Stone brothers become involved with the local Committees of Correspondence and the Inquisition's trial of Galileo Galilei.

Plot summary
Following Grantville's alliance with Gustavus Adolphus and their military successes, texts of modern-day history books of the seventeenth century have become very popular among the powerful personages of Europe and made dramatic effects and turmoil on the continent. Among those that are affected are the Holy Roman Catholic Church with their religious holdings. Father Lawrence Mazzare started the controversy by allowing Father Fredrich von Spee to read his own entry in the Catholic Encyclopedia, thereby stiffening the Jesuit's resistance to the Inquisition. Also Mazzare provided copies of the papers of the Second Vatican Council and other documents to Monsignor Giulio Mazarini, which led Pope Urban VIII to request a summary of Catholic theological reforms over the following centuries in the original timeline.

The newly formed USE acts to open a trade corridor with the Middle East via Venice to insure supplies of materials unavailable within Western Europe; gaining political allies within these regions; and religious allies to spread the doctrines of religious tolerance and the separation of church and state. Michael Stearns selects Lawrence Mazzare to lead the delegation to Venice because of his current fame (or notoriety) among Catholics. Mazzare asks Simon Jones, the Methodist minister, to accompany him as a sign of religious tolerance and Father Augustus Heinzerling. Jones goes along as Mazzare's assistant. Stearns also sends Tom Stone and his family to assist with the production of pharmaceuticals, Sharon Nichols to aid in medical education (and to give her something useful to do while she is grieving over Hans Richter's death in 1633), and Ernst Mauer to advise on public sanitation. Lieutenant Conrad Ursinus is sent as the naval attaché and advisor on shipbuilding and Scottish Captain Andrew Lennox is assigned as the military attaché and commander of the Marine Guard. Lieutenant Billy Trumble is sent as XO of the Marine escort as well as sports advisor. However, the delegation is opposed by the French embassy in Venice led by Claude de Mesmes, comte d'Avaux, who is given orders by Cardinal Richelieu to disrupt trade negotiations between the USE and Venice.

Literary significance and reception
Publishers Weekly in their review said that "It's refreshing to read an alternate history where the problems of two people do amount to a hill of beans, which isn't surprising, since all the installments in this popular series to date have focused as much on ordinary people as on kings and generals. The closing chase sequence is literally a riot."  School Library Journal was mixed in their review saying "this is a good choice for fans of alternative history, although those who prefer the more serious work of Harry Turtledove may find it too upbeat for their taste. Also, familiarity with previous titles is a must as the authors place readers right in the middle of the action." Booklist also noted that the book is "challenging for newcomers, but Young Adults who know the series will enjoy this latest installment" and it would help if the reader have the previous books available.

1634: The Galileo Affair was the first book in the 1632 series to be listed on the New York Times Best Seller list for hardcover fiction. During April 2004, this book was able to stay on the NY Times list for a period of 2 weeks while peaking at number 27.

Besides being listed on the NY Times Best Seller list, 1634: The Galileo Affair was also the first book in the 1632 series to be listed at the top of the Locus (magazine) Hardcovers Bestsellers List for the month of July in 2004 and was also able to reach number 3 while staying on the Locus Paperbacks Bestsellers List for 2 months in 2005.

References

External links
 

1632 series books
2004 American novels
2004 science fiction novels
American alternate history novels
American science fiction novels
Baen Books available as e-books
Books by Eric Flint
Collaborative novels
Novels set in Venice
Fiction set in 1634
Cultural depictions of Cardinal Mazarin
Novels set in the 1630s
Cultural depictions of Cardinal Richelieu